is a 1957 black-and-white Japanese film drama directed by Noboru Nakamura. It was announced that the film will screen as When It Rains, It Pours at the Tokyo Filmex in 2013.

Cast 
 Keiji Sada
 Mariko Okada
 Miyuki Kuwano
 Sadako Sawamura
 So Yamamura

References

External links 
 Doshaburi at Shochiku

Japanese drama films
Japanese black-and-white films
1957 films
Films directed by Noboru Nakamura
1957 drama films
Shochiku films
1950s Japanese films
1950s Japanese-language films